Canciones para después de una guerra ("Songs for after a war") is a 1971 Spanish documentary film directed and written by Basilio Martín Patino based on post-war Spain. It was done in secret in 1971 and was not released until 1976, shortly after the death of Francisco Franco.

Description
The film consists on a series of archival footage, all previously approved by the Francoist censorship, with popular songs of the time that give a second meaning, often satirical, to what is displayed.

References

External links
 

Spanish documentary films
Spanish musical films
1971 films
1976 films
Films directed by Basilio Martín Patino
1970s Spanish films